Uromyces pisi-sativi is a fungal plant pathogen.

It causes small orange dots on the lower side of leaves on Euphorbia cyparissias. It lives on Pisum and on Lathyrus and on other plants from the family Fabaceae.

References

External links
 Index Fungorum
 USDA ARS Fungal Database

Fungal plant pathogens and diseases
pisi-sativi